The Muskegon Lumberjacks were an International Hockey League (IHL) team based in Muskegon, Michigan.

Facts
Founded: 1984–85 season
Arena: L.C. Walker Arena (capacity 5,100)
Uniform colors: black, white, and yellow
Logo design: crossed hockey sticks behind the word "Lumberjacks" and a portrait of a stereotypical lumberjack.
Division titles won: 6 (1984–85, 1985–86, 1986–87, 1988–89, 1989–90, 1991–92)
Regular season titles won: 3 (1987–88, 1988–89, 1989–90)
League championships won: 2 (1985–86, 1988–89)
Local Media: Muskegon Chronicle

History
The Muskegon Mohawks franchise were purchased by Larry Gordon following the 1983–84 season for $1 and renamed the Lumberjacks following a name-the-team contest.  The Lumberjacks name came from the high level of importance that the lumber industry had in Muskegon's history. The team moved to Cleveland, Ohio, in 1992 and was renamed the Cleveland Lumberjacks.

Market previously served by:
Muskegon Mohawks of the IHL (1965–84)
Franchise replaced by:
Muskegon Fury of the CoHL/UHL/IHL (1992–2008)
Muskegon Lumberjacks of the IHL (2008–10)
Muskegon Lumberjacks of the United States Hockey League (2010–present)

Season-by-Season record
Note: GP = Games played, W = Wins, L = Losses, T = Ties, OTL = Overtime losses/Shootout losses, Pts = Points, GF = Goals for, GA = Goals against, PIM = Penalties in minutes

Team records
Note: Goaltending stats are incomplete during this period.
Goals: 62 Scott Gruhl (1984–85)
Assists: 82 Jock Callander (1986–87)
Points: 137 Dave Michayluk (1987–88)
Penalty Minutes: 450 Pat Mayer (1987–88)
Career Goals: 335 Dave Michayluk
Career Assists: 436 Jock Callander
Career Points: 769 Dave Michayluk
Career Penalty Minutes: 1452 Mitch Wilson
Career Games: 564 Dave Michayluk

External links
The Internet Hockey Database - Muskegon Lumberjacks (IHL)

Defunct ice hockey teams in the United States
International Hockey League (1945–2001) teams
Professional ice hockey teams in Michigan
Sports in Muskegon, Michigan
Ice hockey clubs established in 1984
Sports clubs disestablished in 1992
1984 establishments in Michigan
1992 disestablishments in Michigan